Ralph Scott McCreath (April 27, 1919 – May 2, 1997) was a Canadian figure skater who competed in single skating, pair skating, ice dancing, and fours. He competed in pairs with Veronica Clarke, Norah McCarthy, Eleanor O'Meara, Bunty Lang, and Betty Chambers, and in fours with fours with Dorothy Caley, Hazel Caley, and Montgomery Wilson, winning the 1939 North American title.

McCreath started skating for the Toronto Skating Club in 1933. He was the 1940, 1941, and 1946 Canadian national champion and 1941 North American in single skating.  In pairs, he won six national and two North American titles with three different partners.  As an ice dancer, he competed with Veronica Clarke. They won the Tenstep gold medal and the Waltz silver medal at the 1937 Canadian Figure Skating Championships and the Fourteenstep gold medal at the 1938 Canadian Figure Skating Championships.

He served in the 48th Highlanders of Canada and the Royal Canadian Ordnance Corps during World War II. After his competitive career, he became a judge, team member, and member of the Canadian Figure Skating Association. He was inducted into the Canadian Figure Skating Hall of Fame in the Athlete category in 1994.

Results

Singles career

 J = Junior level
 McCreath did not compete between 1941 and 1946 due to World War Two.

Pairs career
(with Eleanor O'Meara)

(with Norah McCarthy)

(with Veronica Clarke)

(with Betty Chambers)

 J = Junior level

(with Bunty Lang)

 J = Junior level

Ice dancing career
(with Veronica Clarke)

Fours career
(with Dorothy Caley, Hazel Caley, and Montgomery Wilson)
 

(with Constance Wilson-Samuel, Montgomery Wilson, and Veronica Clarke)

(with Elizabeth Fisher, Mrs. Spencer Merry, and Hubert Sprott)

References

 1994 Canadian Figure Skating Hall of Fame Induction
 
 

Canadian male single skaters
Canadian male pair skaters
Canadian male ice dancers
1919 births
1997 deaths
20th-century Canadian people